Farmington Historic District is a national historic district located at Farmington, Davie County, North Carolina. The district encompasses 87 contributing buildings, 2 contributing sites, and 3 contributing objects in the unincorporated community of Farmington. It primarily includes residential, agricultural, commercial, religious, and educational buildings with notable examples of Greek Revival, Italianate, Queen Anne, American Craftsman, and Colonial Revival style architecture.  Notable contributing resources include the Farmington Community Cemetery (1881), Wiseman-Kennen House (1873), Dr. Lester P. and Helen Bahnson Martin House (1936, 1987), Williard Garage (1920s), Francis Marion Johnson Store (1873, 1922), Charles F. and Jane A. Bahnson House (c. 1878), Jarvis-Horne Store (c. 1870, 1910, 1940), Brock Marker (c. 1925), Farmington School Auditorium, Cafeteria, and Home Economics Classroom (1950, 1955), Farmington School Agricultural Building (1936), (former) Farmington Baptist Church (1882), Farmington Methodist Church (1882, 1924, 1950), and Farmington Post Office/Barber Shop (1928, 1938).

It was added to the National Register of Historic Places in 2010.

References

Historic districts on the National Register of Historic Places in North Carolina
Italianate architecture in North Carolina
Greek Revival architecture in North Carolina
Queen Anne architecture in North Carolina
Colonial Revival architecture in North Carolina
Buildings and structures in Davie County, North Carolina
National Register of Historic Places in Davie County, North Carolina